Dichomeris homaloxesta is a moth in the family Gelechiidae. It was described by Edward Meyrick in 1921. It is found in Zimbabwe.

The wingspan is about 14 mm. The forewings are grey with a faint yellowish tinge and violet reflections. The extreme costal edge is whitish from about one-fifth to three-fifths. The hindwings are rather dark grey.

References

Endemic fauna of Zimbabwe
Moths described in 1921